The 2011–12 BIH Premier League season is the eleventh since its establishment.

Teams

Regular season

Standings

Pld - Played; W - Won; L - Lost; PF - Points for; PA - Points against; Diff - Difference; Pts - Points.

Championship Round

Standings

Pld - Played; W - Won; L - Lost; PF - Points for; PA - Points against; Diff - Difference; Pts - Points.

See also
2011–12 SEHA League

External links
Scoresway  

Handball Championship of Bosnia and Herzegovina
2011–12 domestic handball leagues